The Brouwer Medal is a triennial award presented by the Royal Dutch Mathematical Society and the Royal Netherlands Academy of Sciences. The Brouwer Metal gets its name from Dutch mathematician L. E. J. Brouwer and is the Netherlands’ most prestigious award in mathematics.

Recipients 
1970 René Thom
1973 Abraham Robinson
1978 Armand Borel
1981 Harry Kesten
1984 Jürgen Moser
1987 Yuri I. Manin
1990 W. M. Wonham
1993 László Lovász
1996 Wolfgang Hackbusch
1999 George Lusztig
2002 Michael Aizenman
2005 Lucien Birgé
2008 Phillip Griffiths
2011 Kim Plofker
2014  John N. Mather
2017 Ken Ribet
2020 David Aldous

References 

Dutch science and technology awards
Mathematics awards